Antonio Buscè (born 12 December 1975) is an Italian former professional footballer who played as a midfielder and is now the manager of Empoli Primavera.

Playing career
Born in Gragnano, Buscè started his career at hometown club Sant'Aniello, then playing at a number of minor league clubs before joining Empoli (then at Serie A) in 2002, and playing till 2009 for the Tuscanians. He ended his career in 2013 after a season with Pisa.

Coaching career
In 2013 Buscè returned to Empoli as a youth coach. In 2019 he was promoted as responsible of the Primavera Under-19 team, extending his contract in 2021.

References

External links
Profile at Lega-Calcio.it 

Living people
1975 births
Italian footballers
Association football midfielders
Serie A players
Serie B players
Reggina 1914 players
Empoli F.C. players
Calcio Padova players
Ravenna F.C. players
Bologna F.C. 1909 players
Pisa S.C. players
Italian football managers